Germantown is a rural locality in the Cassowary Coast Region, Queensland, Australia. The town is a small farming community, currently home to a large cattle farm along with various other farms.

Geography 
Germantown is a small community neighbouring Mena Creek.

History 
After the First World War, many German settlers settled here (hence the town’s name). It was mainly a sugar cane farming town until the early 2010s, at which time a large portion of Germantown was converted from sugar cane into open cattle country. Another portion of Germantown was recently converted into a Banana farm.

References 

Cassowary Coast Region
Localities in Queensland